Oklahoma's 7th congressional district was a district that existed from 1915 through 1953, covering the southwestern portion of the state.

History
After the 1910 Census, Oklahoma was apportioned three new seats in addition to its five seats. Initially, for the years 1913 through 1915, Oklahoma elected those three new representatives at-large statewide.

Oklahoma lost this seat in after the 1950 census reapportioned the state with only six seats, with most of the 7th district being merged into the 6th district.

List of representatives

References

 Congressional Biographical Directory of the United States 1774–present

07
Former congressional districts of the United States